On the Nose is an Irish/Canadian comedy/fantasy film released in 2001. It was written by Tony Philpott and stars Dan Aykroyd and  Robbie Coltrane in a magical comedy where a long dead Australian aboriginal's head is used to predict winners in horse races.  The movie was filmed in Dublin, Ireland.

On the Nose won the Audience Award in 2002 at the Newport Beach Film Festival.

Summary
Robbie Coltrane plays a rehabilitated gambler who is tested beyond all limits when a head stored in the university turns out to accurately predict race horse winners. Robbie Coltrane finds he must hold off a representative from the university of Australia, who has come to reclaim the head and take it back to Australia, and the mob in order to raise money for his daughters tuition.

Cast
 Dan Aykroyd as Dr. Barry Davis
 Robbie Coltrane as Delaney
 Brenda Blethyn as Mrs. Delaney
 Tony Briggs as Michael Miller
 Jim Norton as Patrick Cassidy
 Sinead Keenan as Sinead Delaney
 Don Baker as Barclay
 Glynis Barber as Anthea Davis
 Francis Burke as Nana
 Mark Anthony Byrne as Anto (Uncredited)
 Simon Delaney as Grogan
 Peadar Flanagan as Race Commentator
 Una Kavanagh as Receptionist
 Laurence Kinlan as Kiaran Delaney
 Alvaro Lucchesi as Foley
 Eanna MacLiam as Seamus Boyle
 Una Minto as Woman
 Cathy Murphy as Dolores
 Owen O'Gorman as Teller
 Sean O'Shaughnessy as Liam
 Peter O'Sullevan as Grand National commentator
 Myles Purcell as Egert
 June Rodgers as Eileen Casey
 Des Scahill as Race Commentator
 Zara Turner as Carol Lenahan

External links 
 
 

2001 films
Irish fantasy comedy films
Canadian fantasy comedy films
English-language Irish films
English-language Canadian films
2000s fantasy comedy films
Films set in Dublin (city)
Films shot in Dublin (city)
2001 comedy films
2000s English-language films
2000s Canadian films